Oleksandrivsk or Aleksandrovsk is a small city in Luhansk Municipality, Luhansk Oblast (region) of Ukraine. Population:

Demographics 
Native language as of the Ukrainian Census of 2001:
Russian  56.65%
Ukrainian  41.73%
Armenian  1.46%
Belarusian  0.09%

Gallery

References 

Luhansk
Cities in Luhansk Oblast
Cities of district significance in Ukraine
Slavyanoserbsky Uyezd
Populated places established in the Russian Empire